Pseudohomaloptera is a genus of ray-finned fish in the family Balitoridae.

Species
There are currently 6 recognized species in this genus:
 Pseudohomaloptera batek H. H. Tan, 2009
 Pseudohomaloptera leonardi Hora, 1941
 Pseudohomaloptera sexmaculata Fowler, 1934
 Pseudohomaloptera tatereganii Popta, 1905
 Pseudohomaloptera tecta Randall, Somarriba, Tongnunui & Page, 2022
 Pseudohomaloptera vulgaris Kottelat & X. L. Chu, 1988
 Pseudohomaloptera yunnanensis Y. Y. Chen, 1978

References

Balitoridae